Adonis was a wooden brigantine built at Jervis Bay, New South Wales.

Shipwrecks of the Mid North Coast Region
Ships built in New South Wales
1874 ships
Maritime incidents in December 1889
1871–1900 ships of Australia
Colliers of Australia
Brigantines of Australia